The Edmonton Energy is a professional basketball team in the International Basketball League, formerly known as the Edmonton Chill. The Chill name was revoked in August 2008, after allegations of misconduct were filed with the league regarding Troy Barns, the majority shareholder in the team.

On 27 January 2009, The Edmonton Chill were renamed the Edmonton Energy. Eleven local business owners, led by businessman, chartered accountant, and mayoral candidate David Dorward came together to keep the IBL in Edmonton. Paul Sir was head coach and general manager of the Edmonton Energy.

The Edmonton Energy formerly played their home games at the MacEwan Centre for Sport and Wellness at MacEwan University ,just north of Downtown Edmonton, but moved to the "Butterdome" (or Universiade Pavilion), located at the University of Alberta in the Windsor Park/Garneau area. The Energy was the second Canadian team in the International Basketball League, as Vancouver, British Columbia also had a team called the BC Titans.

2009 season

The Edmonton Energy finished the regular season at the top of the IBL with a 17-3 record.  The entire starting five of Will Funn (Portland State), J.R. Patrick (Santa Clara), Steve Sir (Northern Arizona), Skouson Harker (Oregon), and Lee Scruggs (Georgetown) were named 2009 IBL All-Stars.  The team managed to split with the Los Angeles Lightning in LA, who eventually won the Playoffs. LA featured six former NBA players, including Bryon Russell and Lamond Murray.

Schedule

2010 season

Edmonton had another solid season in the IBL, with the team finishing 14-6. The Energy ended the regular season with a 2-1 series victory over the LA Lightning.  Will Funn, Rashaun Broadus (BYU), Steve Sir, Dave Patten (Weber State), and Skouson Harker were named 2010 IBL All-Stars.  Lee Scruggs was also named Honorable Mention for his veteran leadership and superb shooting as the team captain.

On 30 June 2010, it was announced by the team's ownership group that the team will not be participating in the 2010 playoffs in Portland, Oregon. After finishing second in the Continental Conference, the Energy qualified for the playoffs with a 14-6 record, however team ownership stated that they did not have enough money to fund the trip.

Coach Paul Sir finished his career with the Edmonton Energy with a 31–10 record over his two years as head coach.

Schedule

2011 season

On February 11, 2011 the Club announced that it would be back for the 2011 season.  Andrew Parker, Edmonton Energy guard, stated "We will play this year with a chip on our shoulder and show the fans that we deserve it." .

The team also announced that Rick Stanley will take over as the club's general manager for the 2011 season.  The Energy's head coach is Skouson Harker. 
		
The Edmonton Energy launched a dance team for the 2011 season, and coined them the "NRG Girls." The team is coached by former Grant MacEwan University dance coach and former Edmonton Crush coach Danielle Alasaad. It is composed of 13 dancers from Edmonton and surrounding areas. Girls on the team range from age 17 to age 25.

Team captain and All-Star Lee Scruggs, is an exciting leader. Standing 6’11", ‘Captain Leezy’ cannot help but announce his presence in a game. This larger-than-life Energy team captain brings an impressive resume with his re-signing to the Edmonton IBL team. He began his career on the starting line for the Georgetown Hoyas. Scruggs was named an IBL All-Star in both the 2008 and 2009 Energy seasons, he spent two years in the NBA-D League as a professional rookie and has played for various FIBA leagues around the world. Most importantly, Scruggs is energized to be back as a part of the 2011 team in Edmonton. "I am super motivated to win it all this year; that has been my goal from day one in Edmonton. [W]e have a great team coming into training camp so our expectations are very high and I expect us to be a pretty good team this year- stay tuned for something special."

In April 2011, the Energy signed the Premier Basketball League's 2010-2011 official Player of the Year, Quinnel "Q" Brown. "Q" stands 6 feet 6 inches tall. He is a solid 37% 3 point shooter & an aggressive defenseman. Prior to the season's first game, "Q said that he  was, "looking forward to a strong regular season with the goal being to win the championship and play with a good group of guys."

During their home opener, the Energy had a 129 - 107 victory over the Bellingham Slam on Friday, May 20. They lost the following two games in the series against the Bellingham Slam. The following weekend, the team played one home-game in Edmonton, and then travelled to Raymond, Alberta and Olds, Alberta where they won the entire series against the USA All-Stars. Friday: 131 - 123, Saturday: 140 - 91 and Sunday: 115 - 82.

Schedule

2012 season

Schedule

Notable players 
  Jeff Ferguson 
  Rashaun Broadus
  Stephen Sir 
  Skouson Harker 
  Lee Scruggs

References

External links
Official Website
Team page on IBL Website
Edmonton Energy Blog
Edmonton Energy on USbasket

 
International Basketball League teams
Sports teams in Edmonton
Basketball teams in Alberta
Basketball teams established in 2007
2007 establishments in Alberta